Ending Aging: The Rejuvenation Breakthroughs that Could Reverse Human Aging in Our Lifetime is a 2007 book written by biogerontologist Aubrey de Grey, with his research assistant Michael Rae. Ending Aging describes de Grey's proposal for eliminating aging as a cause of debilitation and death in humans, and restoring the body to an indefinitely youthful state, a project that he calls the "strategies for engineered negligible senescence" ("SENS"). De Grey argues that defeating aging is feasible, possibly within a few decades, and he outlines steps that can be taken to hasten the development of regenerative medicine treatments for each side of aging.

Editions 
 St. Martin's Press, 1st edition (hardcover, 389 pages), released September 4, 2007: 
 St. Martin's Griffin, 1st reprint edition with new afterword (paperback, 448 pages), released October 14, 2008:

Translations 
 German: Niemals alt!: So lässt sich das Altern umkehren. Fortschritte der Verjüngungsforschung, transcript Verlag, Bielefeld 2010
 Spanish: El Fin del Envejecimiento. Los avances que podrían revertir el envejecimiento humano durante nuestra vida, Lola Books, Berlín 2013
 Italian: La fine dell'invecchiamento: Come la scienza potrà esaudire il sogno dell'eterna giovinezza, D Editore, Roma 2016
 Portuguese: O fim do envelhecimento: Os avanços que poderiam reverter o envelhecimento humano durante nossa vida, NTZ, 2018
The book has not been officially translated into Russian, but there is an unofficial non-commercial fan translation named "Отменить Старение", which is distributed on the Internet in PDF format.

See also 
 Life extension
 Rejuvenation
 Longevity escape velocity
 SENS Research Foundation
 Methuselah Foundation
 Pro-aging trance

References

Other References 

 

 

 

 

 

 

 

 

Biomedical engineering
Biogerontology
Technology books
Medical books
Books about life extension
2007 non-fiction books
Transhumanist books